On April 19–21, 1973, a significant tornado outbreak sequence affected portions of the Southern and Midwestern United States, primarily in the states of Arkansas, Missouri, and Oklahoma. The severe weather event generated at least 68 tornadoes, 12 of which were rated as intense events on the Fujita scale. A destructive F3 tornado struck Batesville, Arkansas, injuring 18 people. An F4 tornado killed one person and injured three others near Atlanta, Missouri, though its rating is disputed among tornado specialists. Additionally, destructive F3 tornadoes occurred near Ada, Oklahoma, and Harrison, Arkansas, respectively, killing one person and injuring 40 others.

Outbreak statistics

At least four other tornadoes were reported by either Storm Data or Grazulis, but are not listed in the official records maintained by the Storm Prediction Center. They are as follows:

•Benton County, Missouri (west of Lincoln) – Possible F2 tornado razed a barn and a trailer.
•Andrew County, Missouri (Savannah) – Tornado reported.
•DeKalb County, Missouri – Tornado reported.
•Harrison County, Missouri (Eagleville) – Tornado reported.

Confirmed tornadoes

April 19 event

April 20 event

April 21 event

Batesville, Arkansas

An intense tornado struck the town of Batesville and caused widespread destruction in its path. The tornado passed over the campus of Lyon College, which was called Arkansas College at the time. The tornado tore roofs from buildings on campus. The tornado also dislodged homes and other structures from their foundations, some of which sustained collapse of their walls or lost their roofs. At least one home was completely swept from its foundation but remained intact, suggesting little or no anchoring. 18 people were injured and losses totaled $2.5 million. Prolific rains attended the parent supercell, further damaging structures in town, and severe damage occurred to trees as well. The tornado is officially rated F3, but Thomas P. Grazulis assigned an F2 rating because structures were unattached to their foundations.

Non-tornadic effects
Numerous reports of strong winds and hail came out of this outbreak sequence, including an  wind gust in Huron, South Dakota, on April 19 and  hail in New London, Iowa, on April 21. Overall, there were 101 reports of hail and strong winds.

See also
List of North American tornadoes and tornado outbreaks

Notes

References

Sources

 

Tornadoes of 1973
F4 tornadoes
Tornadoes in Arkansas
Tornadoes in Missouri
Tornadoes in Oklahoma